Sir John Seymour (died 16 November 1663) was an English politician who sat in the House of Commons from 1646 to 1648.

Seymour was the son of Sir Thomas Seymour of Frampton Cotterell. He was knighted at Greenwich on 9 April 1605. He succeeded to his father's estates in 1627, being then 40 years old or more.

In November 1646, Seymour was elected Member of Parliament for Gloucestershire in the Short Parliament. He sat until 1648 when he was excluded under Pride's Purge. 

He married the daughter of John Syms of Poundesford, Somerset. 
 
Seymour died in 1663 and was buried at the church of St Mary at Bitton, Gloucestershire, where there is a monument decorated with female supporters and weepers.

References

Year of birth missing
1663 deaths
English MPs 1640–1648
Politicians from Gloucestershire
People from South Gloucestershire District